Alnus orientalis, the Oriental alder, is a deciduous, short-lived species of alder (Alnus). It grows up to 50 meters high, and is native to Cyprus and Cilicia. Its catkins are brown, and bloom from January to March. It usually lives near water, and is resistant to atmospheric pollution, and, like many other alders, is able to capture atmospheric nitrogen with its roots. It is found in Southern Turkey, northwest Syria, Cyprus, Lebanon, and Iran.

References

orientalis
Taxa named by Joseph Decaisne